Aaka is a genus of hemiptera in the leafhopper family. There is only one species described in this genus, known as Aaka coera. It is distributed in Papua New Guinea.

References

Further reading
Dworakowska, I. (1972a). Aaka gen.n. and some other Erythroneurini (Auchenorrhyncha, Cicadellidae, Typhlocybinae). Bulletin de l'Académie Polonaise des Sciences. Série de Sciences Biologiques20: 769-778.[Zoological Record Volume 109]

Sohi, A.S., Mann, J.S., 1992a. Fourteen new species and some new records of Asian Erythroneurini (Insecta, Auchenorrhyncha, Cicadellidae: Typhlocybinae). Reichenbachia. 29(22): 123-143. (records).

Cicadellidae genera
Insects of Papua New Guinea
Erythroneurini